NurMahal or Noor Mahal is a city and a municipal council in Jalandhar district in the Indian state of Punjab. It is a small town located near the Lohian Khas-Nakodar - Phillaur line in Punjab. This town is also connected with the nearby towns of Phillaur and Nakodar by a road going along the railway lines. Nurmahal is situated 13 km from Nakodar, 33 km from Jalandhar.
Many villages are close by to Nurmahal.

History 
Nurmahal was built on a place where an ancient town, called Kot Kahlur, was located which was proven by the bricks and many coins found beneath the soil of this town. It is believed that the ancient city was abandoned or destroyed around 1300 for an unknown reason. Maharaja Jassa Singh Ahluwalia took this city under his control.

Nurmahal is named after Noor Jahan, the wife of Mughal emperor Jahangir (1605–1627) as she was brought up here, and is thought to have spent her childhood here. The town then came under the rule of Talwan Rajputs and Ahluwalia Sikhs before the East India Company gained control.

Sarai Nurmahal 

Major point of tourist interest in Nurmahal is the Mughal Serai constructed by Noor Jahan. It is a striking example of oriental architecture. This historical monument is looked after by the Archaeological Department. The whole structure of the sarai is in the form of quadrangle consisting of 140 cells, spread over the four sides of the structure.

The best way to reach Serai Nurmahal is to go to Nurmahal railway station, which is the nearest railway station. The junction is served by the Northern Railways. Nurmahal has its own railway station and a huge grain market. Nurmahal has got its own Railway Station also which is situated on Phillaur - Lohian khas line.

Demographics
 India census, NurMahal had a population of 12,630. Males constitute 53% of the population and females 47%. Noor Mahal has an average literacy rate of 71%, higher than the national average of 59.5%: male literacy is 73%, and female literacy is 68%. In Noor Mahal, 13% of the population is under 6 years of age.

Villages
 

Ladhar Kalan

See also
 Jab Harry Met Sejal have some scenes filmed in this city.

References

Cities and towns in Jalandhar district